Brigham Young College was a college and high school in Logan, Utah. It was founded by Brigham Young on 6 August 1877, 23 days before his death.  He deeded several acres of land to a board of trustees for the development of a college. This was just two years after he founded Brigham Young Academy in Provo in 1875, which became Brigham Young University in 1903.

History
Brigham Young established the college to provide higher education to the youth of the Church of Jesus Christ of Latter-day Saints in northern Utah, southern Idaho, and western Wyoming. It was intended to operate similarly to Oberlin College—the students' work would support the college and their needs—but the plan was never fully worked out.  
Classes started on 9 September 1878; they met in Lindquist Hall and also for a time in the basement of the Cache Tabernacle.

Brigham Young College had nearly 40,000 students in the period of its operation.  Initially it was for preparing teachers (1877–1894), then offered college courses and for fifteen years (1894–1909) granted bachelor's degrees. After 1909, it operated as a high school and junior college.

Closure
In 1926, the Board of Education of the Church of Jesus Christ of Latter-day Saints Church Educational System decided to discontinue all its schools except for Brigham Young University. Brigham Young College's buildings were sold to the city of Logan and were used by Logan High School. In August 1962 an earthquake occurred nearby; in 1968 the historical buildings were then demolished and replaced with new construction. The original BYC library collection was given to Utah Agricultural College, also in Logan, now Utah State University. The available property was used to replace the junior high school, now Mt. Logan Middle School.

Athletics
The athletic teams of BYC were known as the Crimsons.

Notable graduates

Melvin J. Ballard
Albert E. Bowen
Hugh B. Brown

Marriner Stoddard Eccles
Richard R. Lyman
John A. Widtsoe

References 

.
.
.
.
.
.
.
.

External links 
 Register of the Papers of the Brigham Young College at the Utah State University Special Collections
 Register of the Brigham Young College Photograph Collection at the Utah State University Special Collections
Lost Colleges – Brigham Young College

Educational institutions disestablished in 1926
Brigham Young
Defunct private universities and colleges in Utah
Educational institutions established in 1877
Universities and colleges affiliated with the Church of Jesus Christ of Latter-day Saints
Buildings and structures in Cache County, Utah
1877 establishments in Utah Territory